Colonel John Campbell, of Shawfield and Islay ( – 13 March 1809) was a Scottish soldier in the British Army. After his early death, his widow Lady Charlotte Bury achieved fame as a diarist and novelist. He was also briefly a politician.

Early life 
Campbell was the oldest son of Walter Campbell of Shawfield and Islay, an advocate who served as Rector of the University of Glasgow from 1789 to 1791, and his first wife Eleanora, daughter of Robert Ker of New Field.

Career 
He joined the British Army in 1789 as an ensign in the 3rd Foot Guards. In 1793 he was promoted to lieutenant and then captain. He left the army in about 1799, and was later a Colonel of the Argyll militia.

In 1796, he married Lady Charlotte Susan Maria Campbell, daughter of the 5th Duke of Argyll. They had at least two sons and six daughters, but only two of the daughters survived their parents. On the death of Walter Campbell in 1816, John's son Walter Frederick Campbell inherited the 240 square mile island of Islay in the Inner Hebrides.

In 1794, he was elected on the interest of his brother-in-law, the 6th Duke of Argyll as the Member of Parliament (MP) for Ayr Burghs. He supported Argyll in opposing the Duke of Portland's ministry, and died two years after his election, aged about 39.

After his death, Lady Charlotte was appointed as a lady-in-waiting in the household of Caroline of Brunswick (then Princess of Wales, later Queen) until 1815, when she married John Bury, who became a Church of England rector. Her first novel was published anonymously in 1812 and followed by a dozen more. She also kept a diary of life in court which was published anonymously in 1838, but widely attributed to her.

Children 

Children of Colonel John Campbell and Lady Charlotte:
Walter Frederick (1798–1855), MP for Argyllshire 1822–32 and 1835–41, and inheritor of the island of Islay
 John George (1800–1830), married Ellen, daughter of Sir Fitzwilliam Barrington, 10th Baronet
 Eliza Maria (1795-1842), palaeontologist, married Sir William Gordon-Cumming, 2nd Baronet
 Eleanora (died 1828), married Henry, Earl of Uxbridge (later (2nd Marquess of Anglesey)
 Harriet Charlotte Beaujolois (died in Naples in February 1848), an author, married Charles, Lord Tullamore (later 2nd Earl of Charleville)
 Emma, married William Russell, youngest son of Lord William Russell
 Adelaide, married Lord Arthur Lennox
 Julia, married Peter Langford-Brooke, of Mere Hall in Cheshire

After John's death the family commissioned Lorenzo Bartolini to sculpt the youngest daughters, Julia and Emma.

References 
 

Year of birth uncertain
1770 births
1809 deaths
People from Islay
Scots Guards officers
Members of the Parliament of the United Kingdom for Scottish constituencies
UK MPs 1807–1812
British Militia officers